Tehran International Puppet Theatre Festival (est.1989) or Mobarak International Puppet Theater Festival occurs in Tehran, Iran, about every two years. It features puppetry acts from around the world. Event organizers include Rahmatollah Mehrabi and Ardeshir Salehpour.

Among the participants:
 Dolls Theatre, Kolkata, India
 Yase-e-Tamam, Tehran 
 State Puppet Theatre Varna, Bulgaria
 Puppetmongers, Canada
 Marionettentheater Schloss Schönbrunn, Vienna, Austria
 Magisch Theatertje, Netherlands
 Belarusian Theatre Lialka, Belarus
 Strangeface Theatre Co., Kent, England
 Strings Attached Puppet Theatre, Germany
 Cengiz Özek Shadow Theater, Turkey
 State Hand Shadow Theater, Georgia
 Figurentheater Vlinders & C°, Belgium ( 1998 Golden Moubarak Award & 2000 )

References

External links
 Library of Congress. Poster for 10th festival. Tehran : Iranian Center for Dramatic Arts, 2004.
 YouTube. Video of puppet and audience outside Tehran City Theater, Tehran, 2010.

Further reading
 
 

Puppet festivals
Events in Tehran
Theatre festivals in Iran
Recurring events established in 1989
Tourist attractions in Tehran
Festivals established in 1989